The Egyptian Athletics Championships is an annual track and field competition which serves as the national championship for Egypt. It is organised by the Egyptian Athletic Federation, Egypt's national governing body for the sport of athletics. The winner of each event at the championships is declared the national champion for that year.

Men

100 metres
1981: Atef Sayed Awad
1982: Mohamed Anwar Mohamed
1983: Mohamed Anwar Mohamed
1984: Mohamed Anwar Mohamed
1985: Mohamed Anwar Mohamed
1986: El Samnudi Isama Athman
1987: Ossama Mohamed Hassan
1988: Ossama Mohamed Hassan
1989: Mohamed Shaban Farag
1990: Youssef Ahmed Youssef
1991: Ahmed Ouda Yad
1992: Youssef Ahmed Youssef
1993: Ahmed Ouda Yad
1994: Ahmed Ouda Yad
1995: Ahmed Ouda Yad
1996: Rida Mohamed Abdel Hamid
1997: Ahmed Ouda Yad
1998: Ahmed Ouda Yad
1999: Rida Mohamed Abdel Hamid
2000: Ahmed Nasr Ahmed
2001: Ahmed Nasr Ahmed
2002: Ahmed Nasr Ahmed
2003: Ahmed Nasr Ahmed
2004: Ahmed Nasr Ahmed
2005: Salem Eid Suleiman

200 metres
1981: Adel Fathi Hassan
1982: Wahid Salah
1983: Nafi Ahmed Mersal
1984: Alaa Touni
1985: Bakr Abdel Magid Aziz
1986: Mohamed Shaban Farag
1987: Ossama Mohamed Hassan
1988: Rafik Abdel Aziz Jaballah
1989: Ahmed Abdel Halim Ghanem
1990: Ahmed Ouda Yad
1991: Ahmed Ouda Yad
1992: Ahmed Ouda Yad
1993: Ahmed Ouda Yad
1994: Ahmed Ouda Yad
1995: Ahmed Ouda Yad
1996: Rida Mohamed Abdel Hamid
1997: Ahmed Ouda Yad
1998: Amin Gomaa Badawi
1999: Amin Gomaa Badawi
2000: Amin Gomaa Badawi
2001: Amin Gomaa Badawi
2002: Amin Gomaa Badawi
2003: Salem Eid Suleiman
2004: Mustafa Amr Ibrahim
2005: Salem Solim Awad

400 metres
1981: Abderrahman Khedir
1982: Nafi Ahmed Mersal
1983: Nafi Ahmed Mersal
1984: Rafik Abdel Aziz Rahab
1985: Ahmed Abdel Halim Ghanem
1986: Ahmed Abdel Halim Ghanem
1987: Rafik Abdel Aziz Jaballah
1988: Rafik Abdel Aziz Jaballah
1989: Ahmed Abdel Halim Ghanem
1990: Ahmed Abdel Halim Ghanem
1991: Ahmed Abdel Halim Ghanem
1992: Ahmed Ouda Yad
1993: Tarek Ibrahim Tabana
1994: El Hafni Abdel Maksoud Ibrahim
1995: Sayed Awad Suleiman
1996: Sayed Awad Suleiman
1997: Atef Abdel Hadi Mohamed
1998: Amin Gomaa Badawi
1999: Amin Gomaa Badawi
2000: Amin Gomaa Badawi
2001: Amin Gomaa Badawi
2002: Amin Gomaa Badawi
2003: Amin Gomaa Badawi
2004: Amin Gomaa Badawi
2005: Amin Gomaa Badawi

800 metres
1981: Abderrahman Khedir
1982: El Sayed Raslan
1983: Amgad Labib El Rashidi
1984: Hamdi Kamel Ahmed
1985: Hamdi Kamel Ahmed
1986: Omar Ibrahim Mohamed
1987: Omar Ibrahim Mohamed
1988: Omar Ibrahim Mohamed
1989: Omar Ibrahim Mohamed
1990: Omar Ibrahim Mohamed
1991: Mohamed Mohamed Hussein
1992: Mohamed Mohamed Hussein
1993: Omar Ibrahim Mohamed
1994: Sayed Awad Suleiman
1995: Sayed Awad Suleiman
1996: Sayed Awad Suleiman
1997: Sayed Awad Suleiman
1998: Mustafa Fawzi Shalabi
1999: Atef Abdel Hadi Mohamed
2000: Sayed Ahmed Sliman
2001: Atef Abdel Hadi Mohamed
2002: Samir Saad El Sayed El Dessouki
2003: Samir Saad El Sayed El Dessouki
2004: Amin Gomaa Badawi
2005: Abdallah Kader Mohamed

1500 metres
1981: Adel Abdallah Mahmoud
1982: Hamdi Kamel Ahmed
1983: ?
1984: Hamdi Kamel Ahmed
1985: Hamdi Kamel Ahmed
1986: Hamdi Kamel Ahmed
1987: Omar Ibrahim Mohamed
1988: Hamdi Kamel Ahmed
1989: Omar Ibrahim Mohamed
1990: Hamdi Kamel Ahmed
1991: Hamdi Kamel Ahmed
1992: Hamdi Kamel Ahmed
1993: Hamdi Kamel Ahmed
1994: Hamdi Kamel Ahmed
1995: Ahmed Mohamed Ibrahim El Jundi
1996: Ahmed Mohamed Ibrahim El Jundi
1997: Mustafa Fawzi Shalabi
1998: Mustafa Fawzi Shalabi
1999: Mustafa Fawzi Shalabi
2000: Mustafa Fawzi Shalabi
2001: Ragab Mohamed Ahmed
2002: Ragab Mohamed Ahmed
2003: Farid Samir Abdallah
2004: Ahmed Sabah Frej
2005: Abdallah Kader Mohamed

5000 metres
1981: Mohamed Abdel Aziz Koreish
1982: Waguih Hafez
1983: ?
1984: Mohamed Idris Ibrahim
1985: Mohamed Idris Ahmed
1986: Mohamed Idris Ibrahim
1987: Ahmed Abdel Malek Abdel Hamid
1988: Mohamed Idris Ibrahim
1989: Mohsen Mohamed Sayed
1990: Ahmed Ali Ellithi
1991: Ahmed Ali Ellithi
1992: Hamdi Kamel Ahmed
1993: Hamdi Kamel Ahmed
1994: El Fouli Mustafa Salem
1995: El Fouli Mustafa Salem
1996: El Fouli Mustafa Salem
1997: El Fouli Mustafa Salem
1998: Ahmed Abdel Magoud Ahmed
1999: Ahmed Abdel Magoud Ahmed
2000: Abd El Rasoul El Badri Ahmed
2001: Ahmed Abdel Magoud Ahmed
2002: Ahmed Abdel Magoud Ahmed
2003: Ahmed Abdel Magoud Ahmed
2004: Hassan Saber Ahmed
2005: Hamzi Mohamed Hamed

10,000 metres
1981: Mohieddin Mahmoud
1982: Waguih Hafez
1983: ?
1984: Mohamed Idris Ibrahim
1985: Mohamed Idris Ahmed
1986: Mohamed Idris Ibrahim
1987: Mohamed Idris Ibrahim
1988: Mohamed Idris Ibrahim
1989: Ahmed Ali Ellithi
1990: Ahmed Ali Ellithi
1991: Mohamed Amin Taha
1992: Yasser Daoud Ali
1993: Ahmed Ali Ellithi
1994: El Fouli Mustafa Salem
1995: Issa Rizk Abu Eddaief
1996: El Fouli Mustafa Salem
1997: El Fouli Mustafa Salem
1998: Ahmed Abdel Magoud Ahmed
1999: Wael Adam
2000: Ahmed Abdel Magoud Ahmed
2001: El Fouli Mustafa Salem
2002: El Fouli Mustafa Salem
2003: Abd El Rasoul El Badri Ahmed
2004: El Fouli Mustafa Salem
2005: Hamzi Mohamed Hamed

Half marathon
1996: Mahmoud Mohd Ahmed El Bahawi

Marathon
1993: Es Sayed El Haddad Essman
1994: ?
1995: Ali Abdel Motaleb Slim
1996: El Fouli Mustafa Salem

3000 metres steeplechase
1986: Ahmed Abdel Malek Abdel Hamid
1987: Mohamed Idris Ibrahim
1988: Mohamed Idris Ibrahim
1989: Mohsen Mohamed Sayed
1990: Rida Ahmed Abdel Hadi
1991: Mohamed Abu Bakr Heremas
1992: Magdi Gherib Suleiman
1993: Magdi Gherib Suleiman
1994: Ahmed Ali Ellithi
1995: Iman Anwar Mohamed
1996: Iman Anwar Mohamed
1997: Magdi Gherib Suleiman
1998: Abd El Rasoul El Badri Ahmed
1999: Abd El Rasoul El Badri Ahmed
2000: Abd El Rasoul El Badri Ahmed
2001: Tamer Eid Ayad
2002: Abd El Rasoul El Badri Ahmed
2003: Awda Sadok Abdallah
2004: Awda Sadok Abdallah
2005: Abd El Rasoul El Badri Ahmed

110 metres hurdles
1981: Shaban Ahmed Mahmoud
1982: Hisham Mohamed Makin
1983: Shaban Ahmed Mahmoud
1984: Shaban Ahmed Mahmoud
1985: Shaban Ahmed Mahmoud
1986: Hisham Mohamed Makin
1987: Shaban Ahmed Mahmoud
1988: Shaban Ahmed Mahmoud
1989: Shaban Ahmed Mahmoud
1990: Ismail Ahmed Mahmoud
1991: Mohamed Sami Mohamed
1992: Mohamed Sami Mohamed
1993: Mohamed Sami Mohamed
1994: Mohamed Sami Mohamed
1995: Mohamed Sami Mohamed
1996: Mohamed Sami Mohamed
1997: Mohamed Sami Mohamed
1998: Mohamed Sami Mohamed
1999: Mohamed Sami Mohamed
2000: Nader Hosni Saad
2001: Mohamed Sami Mohamed
2002: Mohamed Gomaa Mohamed
2003: Nader Hosni Saad
2004: Abdel Aziz Mohamed Mahmoud
2005: Mohamed Gomaa Mohamed

400 metres hurdles
1981: Ahmed Abdel Halim Ghanem
1982: Ahmed Abdel Halim Ghanem
1983: Ahmed Abdel Halim Ghanem
1984: Ahmed Abdel Halim Ghanem
1985: Ahmed Abdel Halim Ghanem
1986: Ahmed Abdel Halim Ghanem
1987: Tarek Ibrahim Tabana
1988: Ahmed Abdel Halim Ghanem
1989: Ahmed Abdel Halim Ghanem
1990: Ahmed Abdel Halim Ghanem
1991: Ahmed Abdel Halim Ghanem
1992: Tarek Ibrahim Tabana
1993: Mohamed Ismaat Abdel Ghani
1994: El Hafni Abdel Maksoud Ibrahim
1995: El Hafni Abdel Maksoud Ibrahim
1996: El Hafni Abdel Maksoud Ibrahim
1997: El Hafni Abdel Maksoud Ibrahim
1998: El Hafni Abdel Maksoud Ibrahim
1999: El Hafni Abdel Maksoud Ibrahim
2000: El Hafni Abdel Maksoud Ibrahim
2001: Ismail Hashem Ismail
2002: Hissam Ahmed Messaoud
2003: Magid Mohamed Mansour
2004: Magid Mohamed Mansour
2005: Hithem Mohamed Ahmed Mahmoud

High jump
1981: 
1982: Ahmed Mohamed Fahmi
1983: Ahmed Mohamed Fahmi
1984: Ahmed Mohamed Fahmi
1985: Hisham Sayed Youssef
1986: Hisham Sayed Youssef
1987: Mahmoud Hisham Salem Nejim
1988: Awail Ahmed Abu Ejla
1989: Awail Ahmed Abu Ejla
1990: Awail Ahmed Abu Ejla
1991: Mohieddin Adel Abdel Moez
1992: Mohieddin Adel Abdel Moez
1993: Mohieddin Adel Abdel Moez
1994: Mohieddin Adel Abdel Moez
1995: Khaled Mohieddin Abdel Mohsen
1996: Mustafa Mustafa Ali
1997: Khaled Mohieddin Abdel Mohsen
1998: Khaled Mohieddin Abdel Mohsen
1999: Hassan Darwish Mahmoud
2000: Hassan Darwish Mahmoud
2001: Mustafa Abdel Jalil Hassanine
2002: Moshe Adel Abu Maati
2003: Nader Mahmoud Mohamed
2004: Ahmed Farouk Abdel Zaher
2005: Karim Samir Lotfy

Pole vault
1981: Hisham Ismail Ali
1982: Walid Riad Hussein
1983: Issam Fathi Hassan
1984: Walid Riad Hussein
1985: Walid Riad Hussein
1986: Walid Riad Hussein
1987: Issam Fathi Hassan
1988: Issam Fathi Hassan
1989: Sameh Hassan Farid
1990: Issam Fathi Hassan
1991: Khaled Ibrahim Ali
1992: Sameh Hassan Farid
1993: Ahmed Hosni Abu Zid
1994: Sameh Hassan Farid
1995: Sameh Hassan Farid
1996: Sameh Hassan Farid
1997: Ahmed Hosni Abu Zid
1998: Amru Massoud Sayed
1999: Amru Massoud Sayed
2000: Medhat Salem Abul Salem
2001: Amru Ibrahim Ali
2002: Medhat Salem Abul Salem
2003: Mustafa Taha Hussein
2004: Mustafa Taha Hussein
2005: Mohamed Jamel Mohamed Kamel

Long jump
1981: Mohamed Kharib Mansour
1982: Mohamed Kharib Mansour
1983: Mohamed Kharib Mansour
1984: Mohamed Kharib Mansour
1985: Ihab Ibrahim Abdel Hamid
1986: Ihab Ibrahim Abdel Hamid
1987: Gamal Ahmed Abdel Magid
1988: Ahmed Hassan Mohamed
1989: Youssef Sayed Mohamed Awad
1990: Youssef Sayed Mohamed Awad
1991: Youssef Sayed Mohamed Awad
1992: Mohamed Kamel Abdel Kader
1993: Mustafa Yakout Khalil
1994: Hatem Mersal
1995: Khaled Es Sayed Abu El Wafa
1996: Hatem Mersal
1997: Assama Ibrahim Abdel Moncef
1998: Hithem Noureddin Mohamed
1999: Hithem Noureddin Mohamed
2000: Assama Ibrahim Abdel Moncef
2001: Hithem Noureddin Mohamed
2002: Hatem Mersal
2003: Hatem Mersal
2004: Hatem Mersal
2005: Hatem Mersal

Triple jump
1981: Ahmed Hassan Badra
1982: Ahmed Hassan Badra
1983: Ahmed Hassan Badra
1984: Ahmed Hassan Badra
1985: Gamal Ahmed Abdel Magid
1986: Ahmed Hassan Badra
1987: Ahmed Hassan Badra
1988: Youssef Sayed Mohamed Awad
1989: Ahmed Hassan Badra
1990: Mohamed Kamel Abdel Kader
1991: Ahmed Hassan Mohamed
1992: Mohamed Kamel Abdel Kader
1993: Khaled Es Sayed Abu El Wafa
1994: Mohamed Kamel Abdel Kader
1995: Mohamed Kamel Abdel Kader
1996: Mohamed Kamel Abdel Kader
1997: Assama Ibrahim Abdel Moncef
1998: Mohamed Kamel Abdel Kader
1999: Assama Ibrahim Abdel Moncef
2000: Assama Ibrahim Abdel Moncef
2001: Hithem Noureddin Mohamed
2002: Hithem Noureddin Mohamed
2003: Mohamed Mohamed El Tohami
2004: Mohamed Mohamed El Tohami
2005: Ahmed Ibrahim Zhogbi

Shot put
1981: Nagui Asaad
1982: Mahmoud Ali Shaheen
1983: Ahmed Kamel Shatta
1984: Ahmed Kamel Shatta
1985: Ahmed Mohamed Ashoush
1986: Ahmed Mohamed Ashoush
1987: Ahmed Kamel Shatta
1988: Ahmed Kamel Shatta
1989: Hassan Ahmed Hamad
1990: Dhia Kamel Ahmed
1991: Mohamed Ismail Muslem
1992: Mohamed Ismail Muslem
1993: Mohamed Ismail Muslem
1994: Dhia Kamel Ahmed
1995: Ahmed Sayed Mohamed Ali
1996: Mohamed Kacem Awad
1997: Dhia Kamel Ahmed
1998: Dhia Kamel Ahmed
1999: Mohamed Kacem Awad
2000: Mohamed Kacem Awad
2001: Mohamed Kacem Awad
2002: Mohamed Abdelatif Abu Nasr
2003: Yasser Ibrahim Farag
2004: Yasser Ibrahim Farag
2005: Yasser Ibrahim Farag
2006: Yasser Ibrahim Farag

Discus throw
1981: Hassan Ahmed Hamad
1982: Hassan Ahmed Hamad
1983: Mohamed Naguib Hamed
1984: Hassan Ahmed Hamad
1985: Mohamed Naguib Hamed
1986: Mohamed Naguib Hamed
1987: Hassan Ahmed Hamad
1988: Mohamed Naguib Hamed
1989: Hassan Ahmed Hamad
1990: Mohamed Naguib Hamed
1991: Mohamed Naguib Hamed
1992: Mohamed Naguib Hamed
1993: Dhia Kamel Ahmed
1994: Dhia Kamel Ahmed
1995: Dhia Kamel Ahmed
1996: Sameh Mohamed Hassan El Hattab
1997: Sameh Mohamed Hassan El Hattab
1998: Sameh Mohamed Hassan El Hattab
1999: Sameh Mohamed Hassan El Hattab
2000: Sameh Mohamed Hassan El Hattab
2001: Sameh Mohamed Hassan El Hattab
2002: Omar Ahmed El Ghazaly
2003: Yasser Ibrahim Farag
2004: Omar Ahmed El Ghazaly
2005: Omar Ahmed El Ghazaly

Hammer throw
1981: Hisham Greiss
1982: Hisham Greiss
1983: Ahmed Ibrahim Taha
1984: Hisham Abdeslam Zaki
1985: Ahmed Ibrahim Taha
1986: Ahmed Ibrahim Taha
1987: Ahmed Ibrahim Taha
1988: Ahmed Ibrahim Taha
1989: Magdi Zakaria Abdallah
1990: Magdi Zakaria Abdallah
1991: Sherif Farouk El Hennawi
1992: Magdi Zakaria Abdallah
1993: Sherif Farouk El Hennawi
1994: Magdi Zakaria Abdallah
1995: Magdi Zakaria Abdallah
1996: Magdi Zakaria Abdallah
1997: Sherif Farouk El Hennawi
1998: Yamen Hussein Abdel Moneim
1999: Yamen Hussein Abdel Moneim
2000: Yamen Hussein Abdel Moneim
2001: Yamen Hussein Abdel Moneim
2002: Yamen Hussein Abdel Moneim
2003: Mohsen Mohamed Anani
2004: Mohsen Mohamed Anani
2005: Ahmed Abderraouf Mohamed

Javelin throw
1981: Slouma Ibrahim Awad
1982: Slouma Ibrahim Awad
1983: Akram Mohamed Khamis
1984: Slouma Ibrahim Awad
1985: Akram Mohamed Khamis
1986: Mohamed Abdel Halil El Ashri
1987: Akram Mohamed Khamis
1988: Akram Mohamed Khamis
1989: Slouma Ibrahim Awad
1990: Akram Mohamed Khamis
1991: Magdi Kamel Shaker
1992: Khaled Es Sayed Yassin
1993: Sayed Mohamed Abderrahman
1994: Walid Abderrazak Mohamed
1995: Khaled Es Sayed Yassin
1996: Khaled Es Sayed Yassin
1997: Khaled Es Sayed Yassin
1998: Khaled Es Sayed Yassin
1999: Khaled Es Sayed Yassin
2000: Walid Abderrazak Mohamed
2001: Walid Abderrazak Mohamed
2002: Sadek Abdel Mohsen Anani
2003: Sadek Abdel Mohsen Anani
2004: Walid Abderrazak Mohamed
2005: Walid Abderrazak Mohamed
2006: Walid Abdel Wahab

Decathlon
1985: Abu El Makarem El Hamd
1986: Abu El Makarem El Hamd
1987: Abu El Makarem El Hamd
1988: Abu El Makarem El Hamd
1989: Abu El Makarem El Hamd
1990: Issam Abdelatif Saber
1991: Issam Mohamed El Azzazi
1992: Hassan Farouk Sayed
1993: Issam Mohamed El Azzazi
1994: Hassan Farouk Sayed
1995: Hassan Farouk Sayed
1996: Hassan Farouk Sayed
1997: Hassan Farouk Sayed
1998: Issam Abdelatif Saber
1999: Issam Abdelatif Saber
2000: Mohamed Ahmed El Morsi
2001: Mustafa Taha Hussein
2002: Mustafa Taha Hussein
2003: Mohamed Ahmed El Morsi
2004: Mustafa Taha Hussein
2005: Abdallah Mohamed Saad Hamed

10,000 metres walk
1985: Mujahid El Sayed El Sayed
1986: ?
1987: ?
1988: ?
1989: ?
1990: ?
1991: ?
1992: ?
1993: ?
1994: ?
1995: ?
1996: ?
1997: Hamed Farag Abdel Jalil
1998: Hamed Farag Abdel Jalil
1999: Mahouz Zaki Sayed
2000: Hamed Farag Abdel Jalil
2001: Rami Ali Dib
2002: ?
2003: ?
2004: ?
2005: Hamed Farag Abdel Jalil

20 kilometres walk
1986: Mujahid El Sayed El Sayed
1987: Mujahid El Sayed El Sayed
1988: Mujahid El Sayed El Sayed
1989: Mujahid El Sayed El Sayed
1990: ?
1991: ?
1992: ?
1993: Nehad Es Sayed Abdel Hakim
1994: ?
1995: ?
1996: Nehad Es Sayed Abdel Hakim
1997: Hamed Farag Abdel Jalil
1998: ?
1999: ?
2000: ?
2001: ?
2002: Hamed Farag Abdel Jalil
2003: Karim Sobhi Abdel Adhim
2004: Mahmoud Mohamed Yassin

Women

100 metres
1981: Amal Kahil Mohamed
1982: Himmat Mohamed
1983: ?
1984: Amal Mohamed Fathi
1985: Wafa Bashir Asr
1986: Wafa Bashir Asr
1987: Wafa Bashir Asr
1988: Wafa Bashir Asr
1989: Karima Miskin Saad
1990: Muna Mohamed Mansour
1991: Wafa Bashir Asr
1992: Wafa Bashir Asr
1993: Leila Ibrahim Mohamed
1994: Habir Atia Hassan
1995: Ibtissam Fathi Hassan
1996: Karima Miskin Saad
1997: Karima Miskin Saad
1998: Wafa Mahmoud Mubarak
1999: Karima Miskin Saad
2000: Wafa Mahmoud Mubarak
2001: Wafa Mahmoud Mubarak
2002: Sarah Mohamed Mohamed
2003: Marwa Samir Idris
2004: Azza Abdel Basat Sayed
2005: Yousra Mejdi Douida

200 metres
1981: Amal Kahil Mohamed
1982: Fatima Amir
1983: ?
1984: Nagwa Abd El Hay Riad
1985: Wafa Bashir Asr
1986: Wafa Bashir Asr
1987: Wafa Bashir Asr
1988: Wafa Bashir Asr
1989: Karima Miskin Saad
1990: Wafa Bashir Asr
1991: Wafa Bashir Asr
1992: Karima Miskin Saad
1993: Karima Miskin Saad
1994: Karima Miskin Saad
1995: Karima Miskin Saad
1996: Karima Miskin Saad
1997: Karima Miskin Saad
1998: Karima Miskin Saad
1999: Karima Miskin Saad
2000: Wafa Mahmoud Mubarak
2001: Sarah Fawzi El Shami
2002: Ines Abul Ala Mohamed
2003: Wafa Mahmoud Mubarak
2004: Azza Abdel Basat Sayed
2005: Yousra Mejdi Douida

400 metres
1981: Fayza Abdel Naba Ibrahim
1982: Fatima Amir
1983: ?
1984: Aba Ahmed Abdel Wahab
1985: Aba Ahmed Abdel Wahab
1986: Samia Mahjoub Abdel Ghali
1987: Karima Miskin Saad
1988: Karima Miskin Saad
1989: Karima Miskin Saad
1990: Karima Miskin Saad
1991: Karima Miskin Saad
1992: Karima Miskin Saad
1993: Karima Miskin Saad
1994: Karima Miskin Saad
1995: Karima Miskin Saad
1996: Hala Ahmed Abderrahim
1997: Ibtissam Fathi Hassan
1998: Hala Ahmed Abderrahim
1999: Hala Ahmed Abderrahim
2000: Ines Abul Ala Mohamed
2001: Ines Abul Ala Mohamed
2002: Ines Abul Ala Mohamed
2003: Wafa Mahmoud Mubarak
2004: Wala Mohamed Ahmed
2005: Wala Mohamed Ahmed

800 metres
1982: Zeinab Es Sayed Mersal
1983: ?
1984: Fayza Abdel Naba Ibrahim
1985: Fayza Abdel Naba Ibrahim
1986: Muna Fathi Jawida
1987: Nejia Kamel Mohamed
1988: Nejia Kamel Mohamed
1989: Huda Hashem Ismail
1990: Karima Miskin Saad
1991: Karima Miskin Saad
1992: Madeleine Fayez Amin
1993: Amani Abderrahim Belal
1994: Nadia Hamdi Ahmed
1995: Nadia Hamdi Ahmed
1996: Nadia Hamdi Ahmed
1997: Nadia Hamdi Ahmed
1998: Nadia Hamdi Ahmed
1999: Wala Mohamed Mohamed
2000: Wala Mohamed Mohamed
2001: Wala Mohamed Mohamed
2002: Wala Mohamed Mohamed
2003: Wafa Mahmoud Mubarak
2004: Wala Mohamed Ahmed
2005: Hena Said Jed Ahmed

1500 metres
1982: Zeinab Es Sayed Mersal
1983: ?
1984: Sana Abdel Hadim Yacoubi
1985: Sana Abdel Hadim Yacoubi
1986: Ramzia El Shaffi Mutawali
1987: Nejia Kamel Mohamed
1988: Nejia Kamel Mohamed
1989: Rida Mohamed Ali
1990: Rida Mohamed Ali
1991: Rida Mohamed Ali
1992: Amna Bedawi Jemaa
1993: Nadia Hamdi Ahmed
1994: Nadia Hamdi Ahmed
1995: Nadia Hamdi Ahmed
1996: Nadia Hamdi Ahmed
1997: Nadia Hamdi Ahmed
1998: Nadia Hamdi Ahmed
1999: Nahed Salema Suleiman
2000: Nejia Jamal Sayed
2001: Wala Mohamed Mohamed
2002: Wala Mohamed Mohamed
2003: Shaymaa Ibrahim El Dessouki
2004: Shaymaa Ibrahim El Dessouki
2005: Shima Salah Sabri

3000 metres
1984: Sana Abdel Hadim Yacoubi
1985: Sana Abdel Hadim Yacoubi
1986: Ramzia El Shaffi Mutawali
1987: Muna Sadek Jaber
1988: Rihab Wajdi El Hafnawi
1989: Rida Mohamed Ali
1990: Rida Mohamed Ali
1991: Rida Mohamed Ali
1992: Amna Bedawi Jemaa
1993: Dalia Nabil Abdel Hadim
1994: Rashida Amir Mohamed
1995: Not held
1996: Not held
1997: Not held
1998: Not held
1999: Not held
2000: Not held
2001: Not held
2002: Not held
2003: Not held
2004: Not held
2005: Sara Ahmed Mohamed Hassan

5000 metres
1995: Rashida Amir Mohamed
1996: Rashida Amir Mohamed
1997: Iman Khaled Hassan
1998: Iman Khaled Hassan
1999: Iman Khaled Hassan
2000: Aisha Sayed Hafez
2001: Muna Mahmoud Mohamed
2002: Shaymaa Ibrahim El Dessouki
2003: Douaa Adel Es Sayed
2004: Douaa Adel Es Sayed
2005: Sara Ahmed Mohamed Hassan

10,000 metres
1987: Amina Sayed Shalabi
1988: Fatima Ali Atia
1989: Karima Farag Mohamed
1990: Karima Farag Mohamed
1991: Karima Farag Mohamed
1992: Karima Farag Mohamed
1993: Iman Khaled Hassan
1994: Rashida Amir Mohamed
1995: Rashida Amir Mohamed
1996: Rashida Amir Mohamed
1997: Iman Khaled Hassan
1998: Nagwa Ibrahim Saleh Ali
1999: Nagwa Ibrahim Saleh Ali
2000: Iman Khaled Hassan
2001: Shaymaa Ibrahim El Dessouki
2002: Aisha Sayed Hafez
2003: Douaa Adel Es Sayed
2004: Douaa Adel Es Sayed
2005: Douaa Adel Es Sayed

Half marathon
1993: Nadia Hamdi Ahmed
1994: ?
1995: Dalia Nabil Abdel Hadim
1996: Naima Kamel Abd

100 metres hurdles
1982: Dunia Ali Abu Ghazia
1983: Saad El Hanna El Lathi Mahmoud
1984: Ifaf Abdel Fatah Mohamed
1985: Ifaf Abdel Fatah Mohamed
1986: Saad El Hanna El Lathi Mahmoud
1987: Huda Hashem Ismail
1988: Huda Hashem Ismail
1989: Huda Hashem Ismail
1990: Huda Hashem Ismail
1991: Huda Hashem Ismail
1992: Huda Hashem Ismail
1993: Shirin Mohamed Kheiri El Atrabi
1994: Huda Hashem Ismail
1995: Rania Abdel Aziz Ahmed
1996: Shirin Mohamed Kheiri El Atrabi
1997: Rania Abdel Aziz Ahmed
1998: Shirin Mohamed Kheiri El Atrabi
1999: Nejia Ahmed Fouad
2000: Hajer Mohamed Jelel
2001: Rania Abdel Aziz Ahmed
2002: Nejia Ahmed Fouad
2003: Nanassi Zaki Saddik
2004: Rania Abdel Aziz Ahmed
2005: Ala Sabri Said Mohamed
2006: Abeer Assem Ghandar

400 metres hurdles
1984: Mirfat Ali Mabrouk
1985: Saad El Hanna El Lathi Mahmoud
1986: Saad El Hanna El Lathi Mahmoud
1987: Mirfat Ali Mabrouk
1988: Huda Hashem Ismail
1989: Huda Hashem Ismail
1990: Rania Mohamed Ali
1991: Hala Ali Morsi
1992: Rania Mohamed Ali
1993: Rania Mohamed Ali
1994: Amani Abderrahim Belal
1995: Rania Mohamed Ali
1996: Hala Ahmed Abderrahim
1997: Amani Abderrahim Belal
1998: Hala Ahmed Abderrahim
1999: Hala Ahmed Abderrahim
2000: Hala Ahmed Abderrahim
2001: Hala Ahmed Abderrahim
2002: Maha Mohamed Goha
2003: Hela Zakaria Jalil
2004: Rania Abdel Aziz Ahmed
2005: Hela Belsan Jilel

High jump
1982: Huda Abdel Hamid Ibrahim
1983: ?
1984: Mira Endouria
1985: Maha Rashid Mohamed
1986: Muna Ibrahim Ahmed
1987: Jihan Abdel Moneim Abdallah
1988: Ifaf Abdel Fatah Mohamed
1989: Jihan Abdel Moneim Abdallah
1990: Jihan Abdel Moneim Abdallah
1991: Jihan Abdel Moneim Abdallah
1992: Jihan Abdel Moneim Abdallah
1993: Badia Ali Abdessamia
1994: Ghada Mohamed Anwar
1995: Wala Hassan Kibad
1996: Shirin Mohamed Kheiri El Atrabi
1997: Shirin Mohamed Kheiri El Atrabi
1998: Nagwa Ibrahim Mohamed
1999: Maha Mohamed Mohamed
2000: Ghada Mohamed Anwar
2001: Fayza Fouad Ateya
2002: Fayza Fouad Ateya
2003: Fayza Fouad Ateya
2004: Amira Khaled Abou El Eta
2005: Amira Khaled Abou El Eta

Pole vault
1999: Maha Mohamed Abdel Khalek
2000: Maha Mohamed Abdel Khalek
2001: Maha Mohamed Abdel Khalek
2002: Nesrine Ahmed Imam
2003: Maha Mohamed Abdel Khalek
2004: Maha Mohamed Abdel Khalek
2005: Nada Mohamed Abdelatif Salem

Long jump
1982: Soheir Mohamed Ahmed
1983: Ifaf Abdel Fatah Mohamed
1984: Ifaf Abdel Fatah Mohamed
1985: Ifaf Abdel Fatah Mohamed
1986: Ifaf Abdel Fatah Mohamed
1987: Nagwa Abd El Hay Riad
1988: Nagwa Abd El Hay Riad
1989: Nagwa Abd El Hay Riad
1990: Nagwa Abd El Hay Riad
1991: Nagwa Abd El Hay Riad
1992: Iman Hanafi Mahmoud
1993: Nagwa Abd El Hay Riad
1994: Muna Sabri Mahmoud
1995: Muna Sabri Mahmoud
1996: Muna Sabri Mahmoud
1997: Nagwa Abd El Hay Riad
1998: Muna Sabri Mahmoud
1999: Muna Sabri Mahmoud
2000: Ghada Ismail Mustafa
2001: Muna Sabri Mahmoud
2002: Muna Sabri Mahmoud
2003: Muna Sabri Mahmoud
2004: Ghada Ismail Mustafa
2005: Dina Ismail Suleiman

Triple jump
1993: Nagwa Abd El Hay Riad
1994: Fatima Hassan Salahi
1995: Fatima Hassan Salahi
1996: Muna Sabri Mahmoud
1997: Nagwa Abd El Hay Riad
1998: Ghada Ismail Mustafa
1999: Ghada Ismail Mustafa
2000: Ghada Ismail Mustafa
2001: Ghada Ismail Mustafa
2002: Ghada Ismail Mustafa
2003: Muna Khalifa Kamel
2004: Ghada Ismail Mustafa
2005: Ghada Ismail Mustafa

Shot put
1982: Ouda Abdel Hamid Ibrahim
1983: Amina Mahmoud Mohamed
1984: Huda Ibrahim Ahmed
1985: Muna Fahmi Abu Rehab
1986: Hanan Ahmed Khaled
1987: Hanan Ahmed Khaled
1988: Hanan Ahmed Khaled
1989: Hanan Ahmed Khaled
1990: Hanan Ahmed Khaled
1991: Hanan Ahmed Khaled
1992: Hanan Ahmed Khaled
1993: Wafaa Ismail Baghdadi
1994: Hanan Ahmed Khaled
1995: Wafaa Ismail Baghdadi
1996: Hanan Ahmed Khaled
1997: Hanan Ahmed Khaled
1998: Wafaa Ismail Baghdadi
1999: Wafaa Ismail Baghdadi
2000: Wafaa Ismail Baghdadi
2001: Wafaa Ismail Baghdadi
2002: Wafaa Ismail Baghdadi
2003: Wafaa Ismail Baghdadi
2004: Wafaa Ismail Baghdadi
2005: Wafaa Ismail Baghdadi

Discus throw
1982: Ouda Salaheddin Moha
1983: Inhar Salah Eddin
1984: Shadia Ahmed Abdel Rasoul
1985: Inhar Salah Eddin
1986: Shadia Ahmed Abdel Rasoul
1987: Hanan Ahmed Khaled
1988: Hanan Ahmed Khaled
1989: Hanan Ahmed Khaled
1990: Hanan Ahmed Khaled
1991: Hanan Ahmed Khaled
1992: Hanan Ahmed Khaled
1993: Hanan Ahmed Khaled
1994: Hanan Ahmed Khaled
1995: Muna Yahia El Bassal
1996: Hanan Ahmed Khaled
1997: Hanan Ahmed Khaled
1998: Wala Khalil Ibrahim
1999: Hanan Ahmed Khaled
2000: Hiba Meshili Abu Zaghari
2001: Hiba Meshili Abu Zaghari
2002: Hiba Saad Abdallah
2003: Hiba Meshili Abu Zaghari
2004: Hiba Meshili Abu Zaghari
2005: Chima Mohamed Azzeddine

Hammer throw
1998: Hanan Ahmed Khaled
1999: Marwa Hussein
2000: Marwa Hussein
2001: Marwa Hussein
2002: Marwa Hussein
2003: Marwa Hussein
2004: Marwa Hussein
2005: Marwa Hussein

Javelin throw
1982: Zeinab Ali Mabrouk
1983: Amina Mahmoud Mohamed
1984: Amal Mahmoud El Sayed
1985: Amal Mahmoud El Sayed
1986: Wajla Abdel Moneim Ali
1987: Wajla Abdel Moneim Ali
1988: Wajla Abdel Moneim Ali
1989: Maya Ali Abdessamad
1990: Wajla Abdel Moneim Ali
1991: Amira Sayed Madhar
1992: Maya Ali Abdessamad
1993: Maya Ali Abdessamad
1994: Maya Ali Abdessamad
1995: Maya Ali Abdessamad
1996: Maya Ali Abdessamad
1997: Rania Moussa Khaled
1998: Hanaa Salah El Melegi
1999: Nesrine Mohamed Mohieddin
2000: Muna Mustafa Youssef
2001: Muna Mustafa Youssef
2002: Muna Mustafa Youssef
2003: Safar Mohamed El Mekkawi
2004: Hanaa Ramadan Omar
2005: Hanaa Ramadan Omar

Heptathlon
1985: Saliha Mohamed Mesiri
1986: Ifaf Abdel Fatah Mohamed
1987: Huda Hashem Ismail
1988: ?
1989: Badia Ali Abdessamia
1990: Huda Hashem Ismail
1991: Huda Hashem Ismail
1992: Huda Hashem Ismail
1993: Shirin Mohamed Kheiri El Atrabi
1994: Rania Mohamed Ali
1995: Shirin Mohamed Kheiri El Atrabi
1996: Rania Abdel Aziz Ahmed
1997: Shirin Mohamed Kheiri El Atrabi
1998: Houria Hassan Abu Megd
1999: Hani Jamal Es Sayed
2000: Hani Jamal Es Sayed
2001: Hani Jamal Es Sayed
2002: Shima Fathi Tehemar
2003: Shima Fathi Tehemar
2004: Shima Fathi Tehemar
2005: Monal Ismail Attar

5000 metres walk
1985: Karima Si Mohamed
1986: ?
1987: ?
1988: ?
1989: ?
1990: ?
1991: ?
1992: ?
1993: ?
1994: ?
1995: ?
1996: ?
1997: Nagwa Ibrahim Saleh Ali
1998: Nagwa Ibrahim Saleh Ali
1999: Nagwa Ibrahim Saleh Ali
2000: Nagwa Ibrahim Saleh Ali

10,000 metres walk
2002: Nagwa Ibrahim Saleh Ali
2003: Hanaa Es Sayed Jad
2004: ?
2005: Hanaa Es Sayed Jad

10 kilometres walk
1987: Amani Mohamed Adel
1988: Amani Mohamed Adel
1989: Amani Mohamed Adel
1990: ?
1991: ?
1992: ?
1993: Nagwa Ibrahim Saleh Ali
1994: ?
1995: ?
1996: Nagwa Ibrahim Saleh Ali
1997: Nagwa Ibrahim Saleh Ali
1998: ?
1999: ?
2000: ?
2001: ?
2002: ?
2003: ?
2004: Hanaa Es Sayed Jad

References

Champions 1981–2006
Egyptian Championships. GBR Athletics. Retrieved 2021-04-17.

Winners
Egyptian Championships
Athletics